The 2015–16 TBL season is the 46th season of the Turkish Basketball First League (TBL), the second-tier level league of Turkish club basketball.

Format and promotion and relegation
There are a total of 18 teams participating in the league for the season. Each team plays each other in their group twice during the regular season. The top two teams are promoted to the top-tier Turkish Super League for the next season, and the last three teams are relegated to the third-tier Turkish Basketball Second League.

Clubs and venues

Regular season

League table

Playoffs

External links
Official Site
Türkiye Basketbol Federasyonu

Turkish Basketball First League seasons
First
Turkish